Campanula kantschavelii, also known as Kanchaveli's bellflower, is a species of flowering plant in the family Campanulaceae. It is native to Georgia.

Distribution 
This species is very rare. It is found in the town of Kvareli, Kakheti, Georgia at the basin of the river Alazani. Its area of occupancy is less than 10 km2 and is found on elevations between 800 and 1100m.

Status 
It is listed as critically endangered by the IUCN.

Threats 
Deforestation for road creation and wood harvesting has created stresses on the ecosystem which has led to habitat degradation. This, in turn has led to the decline in the species' population.

Cultivation 
This species can be propagated with cuttings. They prefer direct sunlight although they can tolerate partial shade.

References 

Flora of Georgia (country)
Critically endangered plants
kantschavelii